The Weird Villa is a 2004 Khmer psychological thriller that was advertised as being based on actual events which took place during the French colonial period of Cambodia's history.

With a plotline steeped in psychological horror, the movie echos the styles and themes of numerous classic foreign thrillers such as the South Korean horror film A Tale of Two Sisters,  a movie which features the appearance of a similar stepmother character. The film's setting also resembled the American-Spanish The Others (2001) in creating a haunted house atmosphere, although this setting is also one common feature of Khmer stories and movies. Some poltergeists and paranormal occurrences during the climax of the movie appear to be a nod to several scenes from M. Night Shyamalan's The Sixth Sense.

Box office 
The Weird Villa did well at the Cambodian box office. The week of its release featured the high grossing weekend in 2004. The film is considered one of the better psychological films of 2004 from Cambodia with an intriguing plot and intelligent story. The popular magazine said, "The Weird Villa brings us a terrifying with the psychologist but lives at the haunted house and reminds us of the South Korean 2003 film A Tale of Two Sisters".

2004 films
Cambodian horror films